Majhoi (also spelled Mujhoi) is a village in Azad Jammu and Kashmir, a polity of Kashmir that is administered by Pakistan.

The Jhelum River runs through the village. It also served as the site for the construction of the Neelum-Jhelum hydropower project  

The town gained significant media attention in October of 2007 following the crash of an escort helicopter for then-president Pervez Musharraf within the village. The four soldiers on board were killed; however, Musharraf was unhurt.

References 

Villages in Pakistan